Lakshmi Narasimha Temple is a Vaishnavite temple and one of the eight sacred places of Lord Vishnu in India. It is also known for being one of the eight mahakshetras Narasimha in India. It is situated at the foot of the Auspicious Hill in Mangalagiri which is part of the Mangalagiri Tadepalle Municipal Corporation part of Guntur district of Andhra Pradesh, India. It is one of the temples in the series of three temples located on and at the bottom of the hill, the other two being Panakala Narasimha Temple on the hill and Gandala Narasimha Temple at the top of the hill. It has one of the highest gopurams in South India and only one of its type in this part of India.

History 
The Lakshmi Narasimha Temple is popularly believed to have been founded by Yudhishthira, the eldest Pandava brother. The temple's history is said to be recorded in the Brahma Vaivarta Purana, one of the old Hindu religious scriptures. This temple was patronized by the Vijayanagara rulers. There is an inscription from the time of Krishnadevaraya, who had visited the temple, at the temple site. The temple's tall eleven story gali gopuram was built by Vasireddy Venkatadri Nayudu, a zamindari patron and devotee of Narasimha.

References

External links 

 Mangalagiri Panakala Lakshmi Narasimha Swamy Temple Tour Guide

 

Hindu temples in Guntur district
Narasimha temples